Gerald Davon Hodges Jr. (born January 17, 1991) is a former American football linebacker. He played college football at Penn State. He was drafted by the Minnesota Vikings in the fourth round, 120th overall, of the 2013 NFL Draft.

Early years
A native of Paulsboro, New Jersey, Hodges attended Paulsboro High School, where he lettered in football, wrestling and track. He played mainly as a quarterback and safety on the Red Raiders football team, but also saw time as a return specialist. As a senior, he recorded 61 tackles and grabbed one interception on defense; whilst on offense, he ran for 705 yards on 99 carries and threw for 695 yards and 10 touchdowns, playing a key role in helping Paulsboro win two South Jersey Group I titles and four Colonial Conference Patriot Division championships. He was selected first-team All-South Jersey and first-team All-Conference after his junior and senior seasons.

During high school, Hodges was also a captain of both the wrestling and track and field teams. As a wrestler, he finished third in the state with a 40-1 record as a junior. In track & field, he competed as a member of the relay squads, recording personal-best times of 43.84 seconds in the 4 × 100m and 1:32.58 minutes in the 4 × 200m at the 2007 South Jersey Relays. He was also timed at 4.46 seconds in the 40-yard dash.

Despite having played safety and quarterback in high school, Hodges was rated as the No. 4 overall outside linebacker in the nation by Scout.com. He was recruited heavily by Penn State linebackers coach Ron Vanderlinden. He originally committed to Rutgers, but switched his commitment from Rutgers to the Nittany Lions on December 12, 2008. He also had scholarship offers from Boston College, Pittsburgh, Syracuse, and Iowa, among others.

College career
While attending Pennsylvania State University, Hodges played for the Penn State Nittany Lions football team from 2009 to 2012.

Hodges saw limited action on defense his true freshman year, but was a significant contributor on special teams, playing in all 13 games and delivering three tackles. He started the year as a safety, but moved to linebacker partway through the year.

In 2010, Hodges was injured on the first play of the game against Alabama. He missed the next four games before coming back with a vengeance against Minnesota and Michigan, games in which he recorded two and three tackles respectively. He ended the year recording at least four tackles in each of the team's final three games.

Hodges enjoyed a breakout season in 2011 in which he led the team by recording 106 tackles. He also recorded 10 tackles for a loss, 2 forced fumbles, and 1 interception which he returned 63 yards against Northwestern. In wake of the NCAA sanctions that stemmed from the Penn State child sex abuse scandal, Hodges had the opportunity to transfer, but he ultimately chose to remain loyal to Penn State. Hodges attributed his loyalty to Penn State to his Christian faith. He said, "Every day I wake up and thank God because we could have just been forgotten about. God puts people in my life that are going to help me no matter the situation. He's put coaches in my life that are going to help me out and further my career. Everything, it seems, is working out for the better. I know it might not seem like that ... but when you look deeper and deeper into bowl games and championships, (God) did this for a reason."

Coming into the 2012 season, Hodges was named a preseason first-team All-American by Lindy's College Football Preview as well as first-team All Big Ten. New coach Bill O'Brien briefly toyed with the idea of using Hodges as a kick returner during the team's first game against the Ohio Bobcats, but stopped after Hodges muffed a punt.
In the third game of the year against Navy, Hodges recorded an interception to go along with five tackles. Hodges enjoyed his best game of the season on October 6 against Northwestern when he recorded 11 tackles and a forced fumble.
Hodges had another excellent game on November 17 against Indiana in which he recorded 12 tackles and a diving interception.
It was announced after Penn State's last game that Hodges had been named second-team All-Big Ten.

Professional career
Prior to the draft, NFL.com graded Hodges at 72/100, listing him as a second to third round pick who should be an eventual starter in the NFL and compared him to former linebacker Quincy Black, who was drafted in the third round of the 2007 NFL draft by the Tampa Bay Buccaneers. Matt Miller of Bleacher Report considered Hodges a fifth-round pick, while NFL analyst Mel Kiper Jr. graded him as a possible third-rounder. CBS Sports had Hodges ranked as the 17th-best linebacker prospect in the draft.

At the Combine, Hodges ran the 40-yard dash in 4.70 seconds and had a 119.0 inches (9'11" or 3.02m) on his broad jump. He also completed 22 reps on the weight bench at 225-pounds (13th best among linebackers). At PSU's Pro Day, he also had a 9'11" broad jump and a 35" vertical. He measured at 6'1", 243 lbs at the Combine and 6'2", 233 at his Pro Day.

Minnesota Vikings
Hodges was selected by the Minnesota Vikings in the fourth round, with the 120th overall pick of the 2013 NFL Draft. Hodges signed a four-year, $2.515 million deal with the Vikings on May 14, 2013. After the signing of Jasper Brinkley, Hodges and Brinkley switched jerseys. Due to the injury of Anthony Barr, Hodges was able to have a breakout season topping his rookie seasons. He ended his 2014 season with 66 combined tackles, 0.5 sacks, an interception for a touchdown, and 7 pass deflections.

San Francisco 49ers
On October 6, 2015, the Vikings traded Hodges to the San Francisco 49ers for center Nick Easton and a sixth round pick in the 2016 NFL Draft.

In 2016, Hodges played in 15 games with 12 starts, recording career-highs of 83 tackles, 3 sacks, and two interceptions.

Buffalo Bills
On May 25, 2017, Hodges signed with the Buffalo Bills. He was released on September 3, 2017.

New Orleans Saints
On October 11, 2017, Hodges signed with the New Orleans Saints. He was released by the Saints on February 27, 2018.

Arizona Cardinals
On August 13, 2018, Hodges signed with the Arizona Cardinals. He played in 16 games with six starts, finishing sixth on the team with 55 tackles.

Retirement
On April 6, 2019, Hodges announced his retirement from the NFL. In May 2019, Hodges announced on his Twitter account that he wanted to play again.

References

External links
Penn State Nittany Lions bio
Minnesota Vikings bio

1991 births
Living people
American football linebackers
Arizona Cardinals players
Buffalo Bills players
Minnesota Vikings players
New Orleans Saints players
Penn State Nittany Lions football players
Paulsboro High School alumni
People from Paulsboro, New Jersey
Players of American football from New Jersey
San Francisco 49ers players
Sportspeople from Gloucester County, New Jersey